YARAT Contemporary Art Space also referred to simply as YARAT, is a non-profit art organization based in Baku, Azerbaijan, founded by artist Aida Mahmudova in 2011. YARAT is dedicated to contemporary art with a long-term commitment to creating a hub for artistic practice, research, thinking and education in the Caucasus, Central Asia and the surrounding region. The building is located near National Flag Square.

Building 
YARAT Contemporary Art Centre is housed in a converted Soviet-era naval building overlooking the Caspian Sea, which acted as a maintenance base for navy ships in the 1960s. The conversion has created a 2000 m2 exhibition space spread over two floors. The building showcases temporary exhibitions by leading international artists, highlighting emerging movements and new commissions, as well as housing YARAT Collection displays and library. It was officially opened for the public on March 24, 2015.

Structure 
YARAT consists of the YARAT Contemporary Art Centre, Museum of Azerbaijani Painting of the XX-XXI Centuries and ARTIM Project Space.

Museum of Azerbaijani Painting of the XX-XXI Centuries presents a series of exhibitions with the works from the collection of National Museums and Galleries and organize a public and education programme of events running. The Museum collaborates closely with educational institutions and the museum's staff familiarises pupils and students with expositions through interactive tours by teaching them to comprehend and interpret art.

ARTIM Project Space was established in October 2015 in Old City. ARTIM shows experimental practices and new work by emerging Azeri art professionals (selected through open call) and the international artists from the residency programme. It features multiple small-scale projects each year and hosts ARTIM Lab, a programme enabling young artists to engage in workshops and daily studio practice to generate new ideas and works.

YARAT also have an educative public programme that includes courses, workshops, lectures, screenings, festivals, literature and theatre clubs and family weekends.

Activity 
YARAT has held exhibitions on international artists such as Shirin Neshat, Oscar Murillo, Erbossyn Meldibekov, Almagul Menlibayeva, Alexander Ugay, Nurakhmet Nurbol, Reza Aramesh, Vajiko Chachkhiani, Jan Fabre, Stephen G. Rhodes, Michelangelo Pistoletto, Shilpa Gupta, Zadie Xa, Taus Makhacheva, Pedro Gómez-Egaña, Kamrooz Aram, Dadbeh Bassir, Gelare Khoshgozaran, Timo Nasseri, Navid Nuur.

In April 2021 YARAT held the first ever Baku Street Photography Festival, bringing together juries and lecturers consisting of local and foreign photographers. The contest part of the festival was titled Streets in Focus.

An exhibition by Dutch-Kurdish artist Ahmet Öğüt, No poem loves its poet closed when the artist objected to the  political instrumentalization of his work by YARAT in the Nagorno-Karabakh conflict.

In April 2022, the organization together with the Icharishahar State Historical Architectural Reserve opened the first one-year Contemporary Art Scholl in Azerbaijan.

Group exhibitions

2011 

 Foreword, group show, YARAT Alternative Space, Baku, Azerbaijan

2012 

 Baku Public Art Festival, Baku, Azerbaijan
 Merging Bridges, Baku Museum of Modern Art (MOMA), Baku, Azerbaijan
 Masterpieces in Baku, Christie's on the Caspian, Baku, Azerbaijan
 Commonist, group show, YARAT Alternative Space, Baku, Azerbaijan
 Next Level, contemporary art exhibition, YAY Gallery, Baku, Azerbaijan

2013 

 Participate!. Baku Public Art, Baku, Azerbaijan
 Love Me, Love Me Not: Contemporary Art from Azerbaijan and its Neighbors, Curated by Dina Nasser-Khadivi, Heydar Aliyev Center, Baku, Azerbaijan
 Love Me, Love Me Not, Curated by Dina Nasser-Khadivi, Collateral Event for the 55th Venice Biennale, Venice, Italy
 Home Sweet Home, group show, Azerbaijan Cultural Center, Paris, France
 Home Sweet Home, Baku Museum of Modern Art (MOMA), Baku, Azerbaijan
 Stalmate, solo exhibition, YAY Gallery, Baku, Azerbaijan 
 Fly To Baku, Contemporary Art from Azerbaijan (Traveling exhibition), Kunsthistorisches Museum, Neue Burg, Vienna, Austria
 Transparency of Simplicity, solo photo exhibition, YAY Gallery, Baku, Azerbaijan 
 Black Woman, solo exhibition, YAY Gallery, Baku, Azerbaijan 
 Ganja Art Festival, Khan Baghı, Ganja, Azerbaijan 
 The Other City, group show, YAY Gallery, Baku, Azerbaijan 
 Vise Versa, solo show, YAY Gallery, Baku, Azerbaijan 
 Echo, solo exhibition, YAY Gallery, Baku, Azerbaijan 
 ZAVOD, group show, Old Conditioner Factory, Baku, Azerbaijan 
 Girls Prefer Oilmen, solo show, YAY Gallery, Baku, Azerbaijan

2014 

 Here...Today, London, UK
 Azerbaijan Booth, ART DUBAI Marker 2014, Dubai, UAE 
 GRID International Photo Biennial, Amsterdam, Netherlands
 TalkCloud, solo show, YAY Gallery, Baku, Azerbaijan
 Moscow International Biennale For Young Art, Moscow, Russia
 Cosmoscow International Art Fair, YARAT's booth, Moscow, Russia 
 Poetics of the Ordinary, VIENNAFAIR The New Contemporary, Vienna, Austria
 YAY Gallery UK Art Fair, Saatchi Gallery, London, UK
 Invasion, Museum 2014, group show by ARTIM Project Space, The National Museum of the Arts, The State Carpet Museum, The Historical Architectural Reserve Ateshgah Temple, Baku, Azerbaijan 
 Blue Background, group exhibition, YAY Gallery, Baku, Azerbaijan 
 Anasthesia, solo exhibition, YAY Gallery, Baku, Azerbaijan 
 Two States of Being, Museyib Amirov's solo exhibition, YAY Gallery, Baku, Azerbaijan 
 YAY Gallery at Contemporary Istanbul Art Fair, Istanbul, Turkey 
 Conversations, solo exhibition, YAY Gallery, Baku, Azerbaijan

2015 

 Isolation Room / Gallery Kit, installation project, Port Baku Mall, Baku, Azerbaijan
 The Home of My Eyes, YARAT Centre, Baku, Azerbaijan
 Making Histories, YARAT's Permanent Collection, YARAT Centre, Baku, Azerbaijan 
 The Union of Fire and Water, YARAT's collateral event at the 56th Venice Biennale, Palazzo Barbaro, Venice, Italy
 Refraction, solo exhibition, YAY Gallery, Baku, Azerbaijan 
 A Drop of Sky, Baku Public Art 2015, Baku, Azerbaijan 
 Dua's, solo exhibition, YAY Gallery, Baku, Azerbaijan 
 The Heart Is A Lonely Hunter, YARAT Centre, Baku, Azerbaijan
 XXXXXXY, group show, ARTIM Project Space, Baku, Azerbaijan
 The Unbearable Lightness of Being exhibition, in collaboration with Cuadro Gallery, YAY Gallery, Baku, Azerbaijan 
 Mediator / Destroyer / Reviver, solo show, ARTIM Project Space, Baku, Azerbaijan 
 Meeting Point exhibition, YAY Gallery collaboration with Cuadro Gallery, Dubai, UAE
 I Am Your Only Tiger, solo exhibition, YAY Gallery, Baku, Azerbaijan

2016 

 You Don't Understand Me, experimental performance, ARTIM Project Space, Baku, Azerbaijan 
 Traces of Time, travelling exhibition, Zagatala State Art Gallery, Zagatala, Azerbaijan 
 Something From Nothing, solo show, YAY Gallery, Baku, Azerbaijan 
 UMWELT, solo exhibition, YAY Gallery, Baku, Azerbaijan 
 Paris Art Fair, Grand Palais, Paris Booth, G6, France, Paris 
 To Be Surprised, To Surprise, group show, ARTIM Project Space, Baku, Azerbaijan 
 Half Truths, group show, ARTIM Project Space, Baku, Azerbaijan 
 Illuminato, group show, YARAT Studios, Baku, Azerbaijan 
 Inescapable Droughts, solo show, YARAT Studios, Baku, Azerbaijan 
 300 Word on Resistance, group exhibition, YARAT Centre, Baku, Azerbaijan
 Little Lies, group exhibition, YARAT Centre, Baku, Azerbaijan 
 In This City of Bright Fires, group exhibition, ARTIM Project Space, Baku, Azerbaijan 
 Prospect Off The Slope, solo show, ARTIM Project Space, Baku, Azerbaijan 
 Secrets of The House, group show, ARTIM Project Space, Baku, Azerbaijan 
 Comfortably Numb, group exhibition, ARTIM Project Space, Baku, Azerbaijan 
 Traces of Time, Mingachevir State Art Gallery, Mingachevir, Azerbaijan 
 This Too Shall Pass, solo show, ARTIM Project Space, Azerbaijan, Baku 
 Nə var, odur, solo exhibition, YARAT Centre, Baku, Azerbaijan 
 Dis Place, solo show, YARAT Centre, Baku, Azerbaijan 
 YAY Gallery at Art Dubai Contemporary, 2016
 The Heart Is A Lonely Hunter, group exhibition, Baku, Azerbaijan

2017 

 Dysphonia, group exhibition, ARTIM Project Space, Baku, Azerbaijan 
 Molotov Gulab, solo exhibition, ARTIM Project Space, Baku, Azerbaijan 
 Dear Beloved, solo exhibition, YARAT Centre, Baku, Azerbaijan 
 ARTIM Lab: 100% Made in Azerbaijan, 24 hours group exhibition, ARTIM Project Space, Baku, Azerbaijan 
 YARAT Residency: The Show Must Go On, group show, ARTIM Project Space, Baku, Azerbaijan 
 Traces of Time, travelling exhibition, Gusar State Art Gallery, Gusar, Azerbaijan
 1001 Nights, group exhibition, YAY Gallery, Baku, Azerbaijan 
 ARTIM Lab: Who Cares, 1 day group exhibition, ARTIM Project Space, Baku, Azerbaijan
 Suns and Neons Above Kazakhstan, group show, YARAT Centre, Baku, Azerbaijan 
 Boys Don't Cry, group exhibition, ARTIM Project Space, Baku, Azerbaijan 
 YARAT Residency: Imaginary Strangers, group exhibition, ARTIM Project Space, Baku, Azerbaijan
 Traces of Time, travelling exhibition, Sumqayit State Art Gallery, Sumqayit, Azerbaijan 
 Far Horizons, group exhibition, ARTIM Project Space, Baku, Azerbaijan 
 ARTIM Lab: Zero, 24 hours group exhibition, ARTIM Project Space, Baku, Azerbaijan 
 Neither War, Nor Peace, group exhibition, ARTIM Project Space, Baku, Azerbaijan
 ALL_AND, solo exhibition, YAY Gallery, Baku, Azerbaijan 
 Traces of Time, Yardimly State Art Gallery, Yardimly, Azerbaijan 
 Crumbling Down, Up And Up We Climb, group show, YARAT Centre, Baku, Azerbaijan 
 ARTIM Lab: Monumental, 24 hours exhibition, ARTIM Project Space, Baku, Azerbaijan

2018 

 Nurcan, solo show, ARTIM Project Space, Baku, Azerbaijan
 Not My Fate, solo show, ARTIM Project Space, Baku, Azerbaijan
 Think That Everything That Exists, Does Not Exist, group show, YAY Gallery, Baku, Azerbaijan 
 Non-Imagined Perspectives, solo show, YARAT Centre, Baku, Azerbaijan
 Do It, solo show, YARAT Centre, Baku, Azerbaijan 
 YARAT Residency: Unthought Known, ARTIM Project Space, Baku, Azerbaijan 
 ARTIM Lab: Neuroimaging, 24 hours exhibition, ARTIM Project Space, Baku, Azerbaijan
 Labour, Leisure and Dreams: 1960's Through The Eyes of Azerbaijani Masters, group exhibition, Museum of Azerbaijani Painting of the XX-XXI Centuries
 Məhəllə, group exhibition, ARTIM Project Space, Baku, Azerbaijan
 ARTIM Lab: Mapping The Intangible, 24 hours exhibition, ARTIM Project Space, Baku, Azerbaijan 
 For, In Your Tongue, I Can Not Fit, solo show, YARAT Centre, Baku, Azerbaijan 
 YARAT Residency: Sick Love Nature, group exhibition, ARTIM Project Space, Baku, Azerbaijan
 Once Again That Garden Be, travelling exhibition, Gazakh State Art Gallery, Gazakh, Azerbaijan 
 Full Emptiness: Virtual Reality, art exhibition, ARTIM Project Space, Baku, Azerbaijan
 ARTIM Rooms: New Tales, group exhibition, ARTIM Project Space, Baku, Azerbaijan 
 Structure. Function. Change, group exhibition, YAY Gallery, Baku, Azerbaijan 
 Sleipnir, solo show, YARAT Centre, Baku, Azerbaijan
 Shy Boy of The Pink Future, solo show, ARTIM Project Space, Baku, Azerbaijan 
 Starry Skies, travelling exhibition, Shamkir Youth Center, Shamkir, Azerbaijan 
 Flies Bite It's Going To Rain, solo show, YARAT Centre, Baku, Azerbaijan
 YARAT Residency: Boundary Layers, group exhibition, ARTIM Project Space, Baku, Azerbaijan

2019 

 De/Construction: Santa Claus In The Remote Villages, photo exhibition
 ARTIM Rooms: Perpendicular Truths, group exhibition, ARTIM Project Space, Old City, Baku, Azerbaijan
 The Intimate Beauty, solo exhibition, YAY Gallery, Old City, Baku, Azerbaijan
 ZARAtustra, solo show, YARAT Centre, Baku, Azerbaijan
 ARTIM Lab: Experience. Thoughts. Conclusion, graduation exhibition, ARTIM Project Space, Baku, Azerbaijan
 Once Again That Garden Be, travelling exhibition, Gakh State Art Gallery, Gakh, Azerbaijan 
 Love and Protest, retrospective exhibition, Museum of Azerbaijani Painting of the XX-XXI Centuries, Baku, Azerbaijan
 YARAT Residency: On The Tip of Other Tongues, group exhibition, ARTIM Project Space, Baku, Azerbaijan 
 ARTIM Lab: Ruh Ruh, exhibition, YARAT Studios, Baku, Azerbaijan 
 Dadash Adna: Love Me, multidisciplinary exhibition, ARTIM Project Space, Baku, Azerbaijan 
 Once Again That Garden Be, travelling exhibition, Mahsati Ganjavi Cultural Center, Ganja, Azerbaijan 
 Magohalmi and The Echos of Creation, solo show, YARAT Centre, Baku, Azerbaijan
 Charivari, solo show, YARAT Centre, Baku, Azerbaijan 
 YARAT Residency: Forget What You Know, See Who I Am, group exhibition, ARTIM Project Space, Baku, Azerbaijan
 ARTIM Flux: Peripheral Expansion, group exhibition, ARTIM Project Space, Baku, Azerbaijan 
 Baku Speaking: 1900's – 1940's, Museum of Azerbaijani Painting of the XX-XXI Centuries, Baku, Azerbaijan
 Bifurcation, group exhibition, YARAT Studios, Baku, Azerbaijan
 Once Again That Garden Be, travelling exhibition, Mingachevir State Art Gallery, Mingachevir, Azerbaijan 
 Fragile Frontiers – Visions on Iran's In/Visible Borders, group exhibition, YARAT Centre, Baku, Azerbaijan  
 YARAT Residency: Experiential Time, group exhibition, ARTIM Project Space, Baku, Azerbaijan

2020 

 Talk About Other Things, 1 day studio exhibition, ARTIM Project Space, Old City, Baku, Azerbaijan
 Drastic Measures, solo exhibition, ARTIM Project Space, Baku Azerbaijan
 Once Again That Garden Be, travelling exhibition, Khachmaz State Art Gallery, Khachmaz, Azerbaijan
 Virtual ARTIM, online group exhibition
 Qurban Olum, solo show, YARAT Centre, Baku, Azerbaijan
 No Poem Loves Its Poet, solo show, YARAT Centre, Baku, Azerbaijan 
 Chrysalis: A Moment of Transformation, group show, ARTIM Project Space, Old City, Baku, Azerbaijan
 Make an Island For Yourself, group exhibition, Museum of Azerbaijani Painting of the XX-XXI Centuries, Baku, Azerbaijan
 Fogs Turned Into Epic Story in My Head, group show, YARAT Centre, Baku, Azerbaijan

References 

2011 establishments in Azerbaijan
Establishments in Azerbaijan
Art museums in Baku